U.S. Route 54 (US 54) is a part of the U.S. Highway System that runs from El Paso, Texas, to Interstate 72 (I-72) in Griggsville, Illinois. In the U.S. state of Kansas, US 54 is a main east–west highway that runs from the Oklahoma border east to the Missouri border.

Route description 

US 54 enters the state from Oklahoma in Seward County, and travels through the cities of Liberal and Plains, where it runs concurrently with US 160 in Meade County. Just east of the city of Meade, US 54 splits from US 160 and continues in a northeasterly direction through Meade and Ford counties before beginning a long concurrency with US 400 in Mullinville in Kiowa County.

The highway then travels through the town of Greensburg and continues as a two-lane road through Pratt, Cunningham, and Kingman. The road becomes a divided highway in eastern Kingman County. From Kingman to Garden Plain in Sedgwick County it is a freeway but becomes an at-grade expressway as it passes through Goddard and approaches Wichita.

The freeway resumes as the road crosses the city limits of Wichita near Wichita Dwight D. Eisenhower National Airport. In Wichita, US 54/US 400 is known as Kellogg Avenue, and has junctions with I-235, I-135 and I-35, the Kansas Turnpike, before a junction with K-96. The Kellogg Avenue freeway has six lanes and extends  from 111th Street on the west side of Wichita to Zelta just before the I-35/Kansas Turnpike interchange on the east side. Upgrading of Kellogg Avenue from a surface arterial to a freeway has been underway since the mid-1980s, with the latest interchange project opening in late 2019. The road gets its name from Milo Bailey Kellogg, a shopkeeper and Civil War veteran who was the city's first civilian postmaster in 1870.

The concurrency of US 54 and US 400 continues through Augusta in Butler County before US 400 heads east toward the Missouri state line, while US 54 forms a brief concurrency with US 77 through El Dorado. At El Dorado, US 54 continues its easterly course through rural areas in Greenwood and Woodson counties before passing through the cities of Iola and Fort Scott; US 77 heads north to Junction City. US 54 exits Kansas in Bourbon County before reaching Nevada, Missouri.

History

On March 6, 2020, work began on a $27.6 million project to expand US-54 from two lanes to a four-lane divided limited access expressway, an additional three miles east from Liberal. Koss Construction Company of Topeka is the main contractor of this project.

Construction on the first section of the East Kellogg improvement project started in August 2015. The project included a redesigned intersection with Webb Road and widened US-54 and US-400 from four lanes to six lanes from Webb Road to Greenwich Road. Construction on a second project began in 2016, to continue widening the highway to a six-lane freeway between Greenwich Road and K-96. Also new bridges will be built over I-35/KTA, new ramps will be constructed from southbound I-35/KTA to westbound US-54/US-400 and from eastbound US-54/US-400 to both northbound and southbound I-35/KTA. In addition, two-lane one way frontage roads on each side of the freeway will be built. Construction for both projects should be completed by late 2021. A two-mile section of the new highway, from Eastern Street to the K-96 junction, opened on November 21, 2019. On April 16, 2020, vandals damaged an estimated $50,000 worth of construction equipment, which included a bulldozer, excavator and an off-road vehicle.

Future
The state is studying a northwestern bypass of Wichita, which would redesignate K-254 as US-54.

Major intersections

References

External links

Kansas Department of Transportation State Map
KDOT: Historic State Maps

54
 Kansas
Transportation in Seward County, Kansas
Transportation in Meade County, Kansas
Transportation in Clark County, Kansas
Transportation in Ford County, Kansas
Transportation in Kiowa County, Kansas
Transportation in Pratt County, Kansas
Transportation in Kingman County, Kansas
Transportation in Sedgwick County, Kansas
Transportation in Butler County, Kansas
Transportation in Greenwood County, Kansas
Transportation in Woodson County, Kansas
Transportation in Allen County, Kansas
Transportation in Bourbon County, Kansas